The Australian Masters was an annual golf tournament on the PGA Tour of Australasia held in Victoria, Australia from 1979 to 2015.

History 
In 1989 the International Management Group took control of the management of the tournament.

Though the Australian Masters usually was part of the PGA Tour of Australasia's calendar, the event was not on the Order of Merit in 1992. The PGA Tour of Australasia requested that the field expand from 100 players to a full-field of 120 players. International Management Group (IMG), which ran the event, rejected the request. Frank Williams, an employee of IMG, justified the decision by stating, "The sponsors expect the Masters to be different from other Australian tournaments and it was sold to them as a limited-field special event."

The tournament was co-sanctioned by the European Tour from 2006 to 2009, with a significant 20% increase in the prize fund. Because the tournament is played late in the calendar year, in November or December, it formed part of the following year's European Tour schedule from 2006 through 2008. With the European Tour's decision to realign its schedule with the calendar year for 2010, the 2009 event was the first to be part of the current calendar year's tour schedule. The co-sanctioning with the European Tour was dropped after the 2009 event.

On 18 March 2009 the Victorian State Government announced a major coup, confirming that then World Number 1 Tiger Woods would play in the 2009 event at its new venue, Kingston Heath. The announcement caused a minor public backlash due to 50% of Woods' A$3 million appearance fee being paid by taxpayer funds. Woods' appearance was tipped to generate close to A$20 million for the Victorian economy via tourism and other related areas.

The event is owned by IMG. The event was not played in 2016 and its future is reported to be in doubt.

The tournament's iconic broadcast theme music used during the 1980s and 1990s was "Send Them Victorious" by Graham De Wilde, with tournament's tagline "The Tradition Continues" in use for the duration of its existence.
Greg Norman won the Masters a reccord six times.
The final event featured 56-year-old Peter Senior as the champion. It was his third win in this event and became the first player to win the Australian Open, the Australian PGA Championship and the Australian Masters all in his fifties. Future major winner who was an amateur at the time Bryson DeChambeau finished tied in second place.

Venues
Until 2008, the Australian Masters was always held at the Huntingdale Golf Club in South Oakleigh. From 2009, a rotation system was introduced and the event was staged at different courses in the Melbourne area.

The following venues have been used since the founding of the Australian Masters in 1979.

Winners

Sources:

Notes

References

External links

Coverage on the PGA Tour of Australasia's official site
Coverage on the European Tour's official site

Former PGA Tour of Australasia events
Former European Tour events
Golf tournaments in Australia
Sports competitions in Melbourne
Recurring sporting events established in 1979
Recurring sporting events disestablished in 2015
1979 establishments in Australia
2015 disestablishments in Australia